KZUH (92.7 FM) is a radio station licensed to Minneapolis, Kansas, United States, the station serves the Salina-Manhattan area.  The station is currently owned by Rocking M Media, LLC, while operated by Meridian Media, LLC under a local marketing agreement.

History
KZUH signed on as KILS on February 24, 1993, with a country format. In 1997, Goodstar Broadcasting bought the station and it was rebranded as "92.7 The Zoo", switching to a classic rock format. 
At this time, the station's morning show began to grow and become popular; "The Morning Zoo" with Phill & JJ was ranked #1 in ratings.

In 2001, Goodstar sold the station to Waitt Media, who kept the Zoo branding. Waitt media merged with NRG Media in 2006. Rocking M Radio purchased the station in 2007 and changed the call letters to KZUH.
 
In February 2009, the station flipped to sports talk as "92.7 The Fan." The station was an affiliate of Sporting News Radio, and then ESPN Radio. This format was well-liked among listeners, but due to low advertising revenues, the station made another change.

On August 12, 2010, at 5 p.m., the station flipped to Top 40/CHR as "92.7 The New Zoo." Initially, the station carried the satellite-fed "Hits Now!" format from Dial Global. A few months later, the station dropped the satellite feed and switched to a locally oriented direction with DJ's. However, in the Fall of 2012, the station switched back to Westwood One/Dial Global. In Fall of 2013, KZUH-FM became the #1 most listened to station in Saline County by males/females ages 18–49.

In June 2012, the station became an affiliate for "Sunday Nite Slow Jams", hosted by R. Dub. The 4-hour program plays current and old-school R&B music, along with listener requests. The station also airs the "Hot Mix", a weekend dance mix, on Saturdays from 8 p.m. CST to Midnight.

The station airs local Minneapolis high school games.

In October 2020, newly formed company Meridian Media, LLC began operating KZUH under a local marketing agreement, while remaining under Rocking M ownership.

As part of owner Rocking M Media's bankruptcy reorganization, in which 12 stations in Kansas would be auctioned off to new owners, it was announced on October 31, 2022 that Great Plains Christian Radio, owner of KJRL in Herington, was the winning bidder for KZUH for $280,000. While the bankruptcy court has already approved the purchase, the sale would officially be filed with the FCC on January 26, 2023. If approved, it is likely that KJRL's Contemporary Christian music/talk and teaching format, which is relayed in the Salina area on translator K243BD (96.5 FM), would be moved to KZUH upon closing of the sale.

References

Station history: https://kcradio.robzerwekh.com/927sal.html

External links
 

ZUH
Radio stations established in 1993
Contemporary hit radio stations in the United States